Ingrid of Denmark may refer to:

 Ingerid of Denmark (d. after 1093)
 Queen Ingrid of Denmark (1910–2000)